The 2021 IHF Men's Youth World Championship would have been ninth edition of the championship to be held from 18 to 29 August 2021 in Greece under the aegis of International Handball Federation (IHF). It would have been the first time in history that the championship would have been organised by Hellenic Handball Federation.

On 22 February 2021, the tournament was cancelled due to the COVID-19 pandemic.

Qualification

References

2021 Youth
Men's Youth World Handball Championship
Handball
International handball competitions hosted by Greece
2021 in Greek sport
Men's Youth World Handball
Handball World Youth Championship